Salaf-ud-Din Muhammad Shahryar (Persian: سلف الدین محمد شهریار) (6 January 1605 – 23 January 1628), better known as Shahryar Mirza , was the fifth and youngest son of the Mughal emperor Jahangir. After Jahangir's death, Shahryar made an attempt to become emperor, supported by his  one in influence and powerful stepmother Nur Jahan, who was also his mother-in-law.  The succession was contested, though Shahryar exercised power, based in Lahore, from 7 November 1627 to 19 January 1628, he was defeated and was killed at the orders of his brother Khurram, better known as Shah Jahan once he took the throne. Shahryar would have been the fifth Mughal Emperor, but is usually not counted in the list of Mughal Emperors.

Early years
Shahryar was born a few months before his grandfather, Emperor Akbar's death in 1605. His mother was either a concubine or Jagat Gosain.

In the 16th year of Jahangir's reign, Shahryar married Mihr-un-nissa Begum, the daughter of his step-mother Nur Jahan by her first marriage to Sher Afghan. Shahryar and Mihr-un-nissa had a daughter Arzani Begum.

At Nur Jahan's request, he was given the pargana of Dholpur and its fort from Jahangir which Prince Khurram wanted for himself. He appointed Daria Khan, an Afghan, as its in-charge. This led to a skirmish between Nur Jahan's appointed in-charge Sharifu-l-Mulk, who was a servant of both Shahryar and Daria Khan. Sharifu-l-Mulk arrived on the scene shortly, and tried to force himself into the fort.

On October 13, 1625, Jahangir appointed Shahryar as Governor of Thatta. Sharif-ul Mulk carried out the administration as the Deputy of the Prince.

Reign (1627 -1628)
After the death of his father Jahangir on 28 October 1627, Shahryar, as Nur Jahan desired, ascended to the Mughal throne, but for only three months. Since he was in Lahore at the time, he immediately took over the imperial treasury and distributed over 70 lakh rupees among old and new noblemen to secure his throne. Meanwhile, on the death of the Emperor, Mirza Baisinghar, son of the late Prince Daniyal, fled to Lahore and joined Shahryar.

Soon, near Lahore, Shahryar's forces met those of Asaf Khan, (father of Mumtaz Mahal), who wanted his son-in-law Shah Jahan to ascend the throne, and had already proclaimed Dawar Bakhsh as Emperor near Agra, as a stop-gap arrangement to save the throne for Shah Jahan. Shahryar lost the battle and fled into the fort, where the next morning he was presented in front of Dawar Baksh, who placed him in confinement and two to three days later had him blinded by Asaf Khan, thus bringing his short reign to a tragic end. It is said that Shahryar also had a form of leprosy due to which he had lost all his hair including his eyebrows and eyelashes.

Shahryar Mirza as a Poet                                                           

Like all Mughal princes, Shahryar also had training in poetry and, after he was blinded towards the end of his life, he wrote a poignant verse titled, Bi Gu Kur Shud didah-i-Aftab.

Death
On the 2nd Jumada-l awwal, 1037 A.H., (1628), Shah Jahan ascended to the throne at Lahore, and on the 26th Jumada-l awwal, January 23, 1628, upon his orders, Dawar, his brother Garshasp, Shahryar, and Tahmuras and Hoshang, sons of the deceased Prince Daniyal, were all put to death by Asaf Khan.

Aftermath
After Shahryar's death, Shah Jahan ruled the empire for thirty years, until imprisoned by Aurangzeb and dying eight years later.

Asaf Khan, was made the prime minister of Mughal Empire, and Nur Jahan, with an annual pension of two lakh and spent the rest of her days, confined in her palace in Lahore, along with her daughter Mihr-un-nissa Begum, the widow of Shahryar. Nur Jahan died in 1645 at age 68.

Further reading
 Nur Jahan: Empress of Mughal India, by Ellison Banks Findly, Oxford University Press US. 2000. .

References

1605 births
1628 deaths
Mughal princes
Executed royalty
People executed by the Mughal Empire